Arif Yadulla Abdullayev (born 28 August 1968, Baku, Azerbaijan) is an Azerbaijani wrestler. Abdullayev gained gold medal at the World Championship in 2003 for Freestyle wrestling organized in New York.

References

1968 births
Living people
Olympic wrestlers of Azerbaijan
Sportspeople from Baku
Wrestlers at the 1996 Summer Olympics
Wrestlers at the 2000 Summer Olympics
Azerbaijani male sport wrestlers
World Wrestling Champions
European Wrestling Championships medalists
20th-century Azerbaijani people
21st-century Azerbaijani people